Fekitamoeloa Katoa ‘Utoikamanu (born December 1959) is a Tongan civil servant, diplomat and Cabinet Minister currently serving as Tonga's Minister of Foreign Affairs. From 2005 to 2009 she was Tonga's permanent ambassador to the United Nations, and from 2017 to 2021 she was United Nations High Representative for the Least Developed Countries, Landlocked Developing Countries and Small Island Developing States.

Early life
‘Utoikamanu is a graduate of the University of Auckland. She received her Bachelor of Commerce in Economics degree in 1980 and her Master of Commerce in Economics in 1983. She worked in Tonga's Ministry of Foreign Affairs, as Deputy Secretary of Foreign Affairs from 1991 to 2002, then as Secretary of Foreign Affairs from 2002 to 2005.

Diplomatic career
On 15 February 2015 ‘Utoikamanu was appointed as Tonga's Permanent Representative to the United Nations She continued in the role until late April 2009. While in New York, she also represented the Pacific Islands Forum. Her concomitant ambassadorial rank was that of Tonga's ambassador to the United States, Venezuela and Cuba, and High Commissioner to Canada, from May 26, 2005. As Tonga's representative at the United Nations, ʻUtoikamanu emphasised the need to address the issue of climate change.

In April 2009, she stepped down from her ambassadorial duties, both in the United Nations and the four countries above, and was appointed Deputy Director General of the Secretariat of the Pacific Community. While at the Pacific Community she served as Deputy Pro-Chancellor and Deputy Chair of Council of the University of the South Pacific. In 2016 she was appointed Chief Executive of Tonga's Ministry of Tourism.

On 12 April 2017 she was appointed United Nations High Representative for the Least Developed Countries, Landlocked Developing Countries and Small Island Developing States. In April 2021 she was succeeded in the role by Earle Courtenay Rattray.

Minister of Foreign Affairs
On 28 December 2021 she was appointed to the Cabinet of Siaosi Sovaleni as Minister of Foreign Affairs and Minister of Tourism. She was the only woman in Cabinet, and the only Minister from outside the Legislative Assembly of Tonga.

Honours
National honours
  Order of Queen Sālote Tupou III, Grand Cross (31 July 2008).

References

External links
The Washington Diplomat Newspaper - Ambassador Profile
Permanent Mission of the Kingdom of Tonga to the United Nations

|-

|-

1959 births
Tongan women diplomats
Living people
Tongan diplomats
University of Auckland alumni
Permanent Representatives of Tonga to the United Nations
Ambassadors of Tonga to the United States
High Commissioners of Tonga to Canada
Ambassadors of Tonga to Venezuela
Ambassadors of Tonga to Cuba
Tongan women in politics
Women government ministers of Tonga
Foreign ministers of Tonga
Female foreign ministers
21st-century women politicians
20th-century Tongan women
21st-century Tongan women
20th-century Tongan people
21st-century Tongan people
Women ambassadors
Dames Grand Cross of the Order of Queen Sālote Tupou III